Latinka Perović (4 October 1933 – 12 December 2022) was a  Yugoslav communist leader, historian and politician. During the existence of the Socialist Federal Republic of Yugoslavia Perović was a secretary general of the League of Communists of Serbia in period between 1968 and 1972. In 1972 Federal League of Communists of Yugoslavia dismissed her from her position together with Marko Nikezić and Mirko Tepavac under the accusation that they were excessively liberal. Dismissal of Serbian liberals in 1972 followed an earlier dismissal of Croatian nationalists of the Croatian Spring.

Following her removal from active politics, Perović focused on scientific work at the Institute for the History of the Labor Movement of Serbia (modern day Institute for Recent History of Serbia). During the 1990s breakup of Yugoslavia and the Yugoslav Wars, Perović was one of the sharpest critics of Serbian nationalism, especially Slobodan Milošević and his regime.

Biography
Perović was born in Beloševac, Kragujevac, Kingdom of Yugoslavia (present Serbia) on 4 October 1933. Perović completed local female gymnasium in Kragujevac in 1952.  She graduated in history at the University of Belgrade and earned a PhD degree in political science 1975 at the same university. Earlier, she also earned her master degree at the Faculty of Political Science in Begrade in 1965.

At the age of 27, she was already president of the Conference for the Women's Social Activity of Yugoslavia (1960-1964). Perović was Secretary of the Central Committee of the League of Communists of Serbia from 1968 to 1972. She was considered the most influential woman in Serbia at that time and the only one who did not gain her position based on marriage with a more powerful man than herself, but rather through her own intelligence, competence and ambition.

In 1972 Marko Nikezić (the president of the CC of the LCS) and Perović were removed from their positions because Josip Broz Tito considered their views too liberal. After that, she never returned to politics. Perović devoted herself to historical research and became known as one of the most prominent experts on Serbian history from the 19th century onwards.

From 1976 to 1998 Perović worked at the Institute for Recent History of Serbia. In her writings and studies on modern Serbia, she often emphasizes that Serbia needs a politician who would publicly claim responsibility for the destruction wrought in the former Yugoslavia in order to help the reconciliation with the neighboring states and prevent the recurrence of this kind of tragedy. She was opposed to the regime of Slobodan Milošević, calling his political system a "culture of murder". After the war, she was the first person in Serbia to call the Srebrenica massacre a genocide and call for Serbia's accountability.

From 1993 Perović was an editor in chief of Currents of History magazine.

Death
Perović Petrović died in Belgrade on 12 December 2022, at the age of 89. Perović Petrović was cremated at the Belgrade's Novo Groblje cemetery  on  December 21, 2022 in the presence of her family and friends.

Selected works
2010 book "Facts and Interpretations. Two Conversations with Latinka Perovic" included detailed bibliography of Latinka Perović with the list of 8 monographs, 10 historical source-books with introductory studies on 19th century, 9 historical source-books with introductory studies on 20th and 21st century, 18 forewords and postscripts, 78 studies, discussions and articles and 13 noticed reviews. Bibliography did not include articles, interviews, and speeches on book promotions, which have been published in various newspapers and magazines as well as obituaries. Perović continued writing in the following years. Her 2015 book "Dominantna i neželjena elita" initiated critical response from Croatian Sociologist Mira Bogdanović who in her 2016 book "Elitistički pasijans: Povijesni revizionizam Latinke Perović" criticized Perović for inventing concepts of dominant and unwanted elites which do not exist in Sociological science.

Monographs
Pera Todorović. Rad. Belgrade (1983)
Od centralizma do federalizma: KPJ o nacionalnom pitanju. Globus. Zagreb (1984)
Srpski socijalisti 19. veka: Prilog istoriji socijalističke misli: (1985-1995)
Knj. 1: Prvi poznavaoci i pristalice socijalističkih učenja u Srbiji. Rad. Belgrade (1985) 
Knj. 2: Ideje i pokret Svetozara Markovića. Rad. Belgrade (1985)
Knj. 3. Doktrina narodnjaštva teorijski okvir srpskog socijalizma. Službeni list SRJ. Belgrade (1995) 
Planirana revolucija. Ruski blankizam i jakobinizam. BIGZ-Globus. Belgrade-Zagreb. (1988)
Zatvaranje kruga. Ishod rascepa 1971-1972. Svjetlost. Sarajevo (1991)
Srpsko-ruske revolucionarne veze. Prilozi za istoriju narodnjaštva u Srbiji. Službeni list SRJ. Belgrade (1994)
Ljudi, događaji, knjige, Helsinški odbor za ljudska prava u Srbiji. Belgrade. (two editions). (2000)
Između anarhije i autokratije. Srpsko društvo na prelazima vekova (XIX-XXI). Helsinški odbor za ljudska prava u Srbiji. Belgrade (2006)

References

External links
Interview with RFE/RL
Transcript of radio show "Peščanik"
The Bosnian Institute, Latinka Perović honoured on her 75th Birthday

1933 births
2022 deaths
20th-century Serbian historians
University of Belgrade Faculty of Philosophy alumni
University of Belgrade Faculty of Political Science alumni
Politicians from Kragujevac
Writers from Kragujevac
Central Committee of the League of Communists of Yugoslavia members
League of Communists of Serbia politicians
Liberal Democratic Party (Serbia 2005) politicians
21st-century Serbian historians
Women historians
20th-century Serbian women writers
21st-century Serbian women writers